Phineas Washington Leland (October 4, 1798 – January 22, 1870) was a Massachusetts physician and journalist, and the Collector of Customs for Fall River, Massachusetts, who also served as a member, and as the President of the Massachusetts Senate.

Early life
Leland was born on October 4, 1798 in Grafton, Massachusetts to David Warren and Mary (Rawson) Leland.

Family life
In 1826 Leland married Pamelia W.  Wood of Mendon, Massachusetts, they had five children.

Journalist
In 1836 Leland was the first editor of The Fall River Patriot, and he was also the first editor of the Fall River Weekly News.
While he was a member of the Massachusetts Senate Leland wrote for ''The Boston Post.

Death
Leland died on January 22, 1870.

See also
 64th Massachusetts General Court (1843)

Notes

1798 births
People from Medfield, Massachusetts
Politicians from Fall River, Massachusetts
Democratic Party Massachusetts state senators
American male journalists
Presidents of the Massachusetts Senate
Bowdoin College alumni
1870 deaths
19th-century American politicians
The Boston Post people